This is a list of Senegalese people, organized by the field within which they are primarily notable. this list includes both native and expatriate Senegalese.

Academics

 Rose Dieng-Kuntz (1956–2008), computer scientist
 Cheikh Mbacke, statistician
 Ahmadou Lamine Ndiaye (born 1937), veterinary scientist
 Tomas Diagne, biologist
 Tidiane N'Diaye, anthropologist

Artists

Abdala Faye (born 1971), born in Yene Guedj, near Dakar
Seni Awa Camara (born ca. 1945), sculptor
Ibrahima Kébé (1955–2019), Soninke painter
Joëlle le Bussy Fal (born 1958), sculptor, art dealer, arts organizer, and art curator
Ismaïla Manga (1957–2015), Jola painter
Iba N'Diaye (1928–2008), painter
Henri Sagna (born 1973), sculptor
Issa Samb, also known as Joe Ouakam (1945–2017), painter, sculptor, performance artist, playwright, and poet
Ousmane Sow (1935–2016), sculptor

Athletes
Aliou Cissé (born 1976), football coach and former player.
Amadou Dia Ba (born 1958), Olympic hurdler.
Louis Mbarick Fall (1897–1925), professional boxer. Born in Saint Louis
Demba Ba (born 1985), professional footballer. Born in Sèvres, France
Ndiss Kaba Badji (born 1983), long jumper and triple jumper.
Henri Camara (born 1977), professional footballer. Born in Dakar.
Papiss Cissé (born 1985), professional footballer. Born in Dakar.
Gorgui Dieng (born 1990), professional basketball player. Born in Kébémer
DeSagana Diop (born 1982), former basketball player. Born in Dakar.
Papa Bouba Diop (born 1978), former footballer. Born in Dakar
El Hadji Diouf (born 1981), former footballer. Born in Dakar.
Patrice Evra, professional footballer. Born in Dakar. 
Assane Dame Fall (born 1984), sprint canoer.
N'Goné Fall (born 1967), curator, editor, cultural consultant and academic
Tacko Fall (born 1995), basketball player. Born in Dakar.
Keita Fanta (born 1981), judoka
Morgaro Gomis (born 1985), professional footballer. Born in Le Blanc-Mesnil, France.
Lamine Guèye (born 1960), Olympic skier. Born in Dakar.
Yahiya Doumbia (born 1963), former tennis player
Sadio Mané (born 1992), footballer. Born in Sedhiou
Idrissa Gueye (born 1989), footballer. Born in Dakar
Guirane N'Daw (born 1984), footballer. Born in Rufisque.
Maurice Ndour (born 1992), professional basketball player. Born in Sindia
Issa Ndoye (born 1985), goalkeeper for Senegal.  Born in Thiès.
Leyti Seck (born 1981), Olympic alpine skier. Born in Munich, Germany.
Pape Cheikh Diop (born 1997), professional footballer. Born in Dakar
Tony Sylva (born 1975), former footballer. Born in Guédiawaye
Bacary Sagna (born 1983), professional footballer. Born in Sens, France
Patrick Vieira (born 1976), former footballer. Born in Dakar.

Authors

Mariama Bâ (1929–1981), born in Dakar.
Fatou Diome (born 1968), born in Niodior, Fatick region.
Ousmane Sembène (1923–2007), born in Ziguinchor.
Léopold Senghor (1906–2001), first President of Senegal, born in Joal-Fadiouth, Thiès region.

Dancers

Tamsier Joof (born 1973), born in London of Senegalese extraction.
Assane Konte (born 1951), born in Senegal.

Film

Ousmane Sembène (1923–2007), film director and producer, born in Dakar.
Djibril Diop Mambéty (1948–1998), film director and actor, born in Colobane, Dakar.
Safi Faye (born 1943), film director and ethnologist, born in Dakar.
Dani Kouyaté, born in Burkino Faso.
Moussa Touré (born 1958), film director and actor, born in Dakar.
Moussa Sene Absa (born 1958), film director, painter and songwriter, born in Dakar.

Historians

Cheikh Anta Diop (1923–1986), born in Thieytou, Diourbel.
Paulin Vieyra (1925–1987), born in Porto-Novo, Benin and raised in Senegal.
Iba Der Thiam (1937–2020), born in Kaffrine

Musicians 

Adiouza
Coumba Gawlo
Souleymane Faye
Mame Diarra Sylla
Akon
Ibra
 Didier Awadi
 Booba
 Abdoulaye Diakite
 Aïyb Dieng
 Mamadou Diop
 Youssou N'Dour
 Habib Faye
 Mbaye Dieye Faye
 Nuru Kane
 Seckou Keita
 Mamadou Konte
 Ismaël Lô
 Cheikh Lo
 Baaba Maal
 Jimi Mbaye
 Alioune Mbaye Nder
 Viviane Ndour
 Doudou N'Diaye Rose
 Ismaila Sane
 Julia Sarr
 Mansour Seck
 Thione Seck
 Labah Sosseh
 Mola Sylla
 Mor Thiam

Politicians

Amath Dansokho
Mamadou Dia
Blaise Diagne
Abdou Diouf
Lamine Guèye
Ségolène Royal
Idrissa Seck
Léopold Sédar Senghor
Umar Tal
Abdoulaye Wade
Doudou Thiam
Abdoulaye Bathily

Others

Dr. Daniel Annerose, businessman, born in Dakar
Khoudia Diop (born 1996), model
Ndella Paye (born c.1974), French Afro-feminist and Muslim theologian
Cheikh Sarr, basketball coach

See also
List of writers from Senegal